In descriptive set theory, the Martin measure is a filter on the set of Turing degrees of sets of natural numbers, named after Donald A. Martin. Under the axiom of determinacy it can be shown to be an ultrafilter.

Definition 
Let  be the set of Turing degrees of sets of natural numbers.

Assuming the axiom of determinacy, the cone lemma states that if A is a set of Turing degrees, either A includes a cone or the complement of A contains a cone. It is similar to Wadge's lemma for Wadge degrees, and is important for the following result.

We say that a set  of Turing degrees has measure 1 under the Martin measure exactly when  contains some cone. Since it is possible, for any , to construct a game in which player I has a winning strategy exactly when  contains a cone and in which player II has a winning strategy exactly when the complement of  contains a cone, the axiom of determinacy implies that the measure-1 sets of Turing degrees form an ultrafilter.

Consequences 
It is easy to show that a countable intersection of cones is itself a cone; the Martin measure is therefore a countably complete filter. This result shows part of the important connection between determinacy and large cardinals.

References 

 

Descriptive set theory
Determinacy
Computability theory